Jiuzhang may refer to:

Jiuzhang suanshu, or The Nine Chapters on the Mathematical Art, Chinese mathematics book, composed from the 10th–2nd century BCE
Shu shu Jiuzhang, or Mathematical Treatise in Nine Sections, 13th century Chinese mathematical text by Qin Jiushao
Jiu Zhang, collection of poems attributed to Qu Yuan
Nine Chapter Law, or Jiuzhang Lü, law of the Han dynasty
Jiuzhang (quantum computer), a model quantum computer developed by University of Science and Technology of China

See also
Zhao Jiuzhang